Ken Macklin (born 1952) is a Canadian artist best known for his large abstract sculptures made from industrial materials.

Biography 

Kenneth John Macklin was born in Edmonton, Alberta. From 1972 - 1978, Macklin studied sculpture and ceramics at the University of Alberta. In 1979 Macklin travelled to England to study advanced sculpture at St. Martin's School of Art in London. A professional artist since 1980, Macklin has participated in a number of artists workshops including the Triangle Workshops in New York and Barcelona, and the Emma Lake Artists' Workshops in Saskatchewan. Ken Macklin's sculptures can be found in the civic art collections of St. Albert, Edmonton and Calgary; at the Catalunya Institute of Contemporary Art, Barcelona; Lehigh Valley Hospital, Pennsylvania; Lock Haven University, Pennsylvania; and the Robert T. Webb Sculpture Garden, Dalton, Georgia.

Ken Macklin's sculptures have been praised by a number of critics. Clement Greenberg reportedly hailed his large steel sculpture "Simoon" a "masterpiece". According to Terry Fenton, " Macklin's extraordinary ability to build overall configurations from side-by-side attachments may account for both his poetry and mastery of scale."

Ken Macklin lives and works in Gunn, Alberta.

References

1952 births
Living people
20th-century Canadian sculptors
Canadian male sculptors
20th-century Canadian male artists
21st-century Canadian sculptors
21st-century Canadian male artists
Artists from Edmonton
University of Alberta alumni